Vincent "Vinny" Maddalone (born December 29, 1973) is an American professional boxer who fights at heavyweight.

Professional career
Maddalone, a hard-hitting brawler, turned professional in 1999 and became a popular contender often featured on ESPN. He suffered his first loss against former world champion Al Cole, and then later fought twice against Brian Minto, coming up short in both fights.

Biography 
Maddalone is the youngest of three, and was pitching minor league baseball for the Adirondack Lumberjacks of the independent Northern League when the idea to enter a ToughMan contest first crossed his mind. He fought Friday nights and Saturday nights and was instantly hooked. A proud Italian American and a member of the Teamsters, Maddalone says that he is fighting hard and training hard to finally come to the day when it is just him and the heavyweight champion alone in the ring. He does admit that he had to learn quite a bit when going professional because he never had long amateur career.

Maddalone has had two fights with Brian Minto, the first on July 23, 2004, where Maddalone was stopped in the 10th and final round by knockout. Maddalone showed that he is a strong puncher (knocking Minto down in the very first round) and that he is very tough and can take a lot of hits. His next fight with Minto on October 1, 2005 Maddalone was stopped again, this time in the 7th round of 10 by a TKO. Maddalone has had some great success in the ring, winning most of his fights (16) by TKO. When he has knocked out opponents for a 10 count, it has been in the 1st or 2nd rounds, showing he is an extremely hard hitter.

Recent 
A fight against Evander Holyfield on March 17, 2007, ended in a loss by TKO when his corner threw in the towel in the third round. This defeat was followed by four wins and a lost fight against Denis Boytsov in November 2008 and on April 28, 2009 he defeated Benji Baker by fourth round retirement. Thereafter he lost by unanimous decision against Jean Marc Mormeck but won his next fight against Dominique Alexander by way of technical knockout in the fifth round. On December 9, 2010 he lost fight against Tomasz Adamek who defended his IBF International Heavyweight and WBO and NABO Heavyweight Titles.

On July 7, 2012 fought Tyson Fury in Hand Arena, Clevedon, Somerset, UK for the WBO Intercontinental Title. He was beaten by ruling of TKO in the 5th round when the referee stopped the fight.

Professional boxing record 

|-
|align="center" colspan=8|37 Wins (28 knockouts), 8 Losses, 1 Draw, 1 No Decision
|-
| align="center" style="border-style: none none solid solid; background: #e3e3e3"|Result
| align="center" style="border-style: none none solid solid; background: #e3e3e3"|Record
| align="center" style="border-style: none none solid solid; background: #e3e3e3"|Opponent
| align="center" style="border-style: none none solid solid; background: #e3e3e3"|Type
| align="center" style="border-style: none none solid solid; background: #e3e3e3"|Round
| align="center" style="border-style: none none solid solid; background: #e3e3e3"|Date
| align="center" style="border-style: none none solid solid; background: #e3e3e3"|Location
| align="center" style="border-style: none none solid solid; background: #e3e3e3"|Notes
|-align=center
|style="background:#abcdef;"|Draw
|37-8-1
|align=left| Maurenzo Smith
|MD
|8
|2013-11-22
|align=left|Paramount Theatre, Huntington, New York, U.S.
|align=left|
|-align=center
|Win
|37–8
|align=left| Richard Carmack
|TKO
|3 
|2013-05-11
|align=left|Paramount Theatre, Huntington, New York, U.S.
|align=left|
|-align=center
|Win
|36–8
|align=left| Byron Polley
|TKO
|3 
|2012-12-08
|align=left|Resorts World Casino, New York City, New York, U.S.
|align=left|
|-align=center
|Loss
|35–8
|align=left| Tyson Fury
|TKO
|5 
|2012-07-07
|align=left| Hand Arena, Clevedon, England
|align=left|
|-align=center
|Win
|35–7
|align=left| Chris Koval
|TKO
|4 
|2012-05-02
|align=left| Russo's on the bay, New York City, New York, U.S.
|align=left|
|-align=center
|Win
|34–7
|align=left| Mike Sheppard
|TKO
|1 
|2011-10-22
|align=left| Tropicana Hotel & Casino, Atlantic City, New Jersey, U.S.
|align=left|
|-align=center
|Loss
|33–7
|align=left| Tomasz Adamek
|TKO
|5 
|2010-12-09
|align=left| Prudential Center, Newark, New Jersey, U.S.
|align=left|
|-align=center
|Win
|33–6
|align=left| Dominique Alexander
|TKO
|5 
|2010-03-06
|align=left| Tropicana Hotel & Casino, Atlantic City, New Jersey, U.S.
|align=left|
|-align=center
|Loss
|32–6
|align=left| Jean-Marc Mormeck
|UD
|8
|2009-12-17	
|align=left| Halle Carpentier, Paris XIII, Paris, France
|align=left|
|-align=center
|Win
|32–5
|align=left| Benji Baker
|RTD
|4 
|2009-04-28
|align=left| Russo's On The Bay, New York City, New York, U.S.
|align=left|
|-align=center
|Loss
|31–5
|align=left| Denis Boytsov
|UD
|8
|2008-11-15	
|align=left| Burg-Waechter Castello, Düsseldorf, Germany
|align=left|
|-align=center
|Win
|31–4
|align=left| Terrell Nelson
|TKO
|2 
|2008-10-29	
|align=left| Roseland Ballroom, New York City, New York, U.S.
|align=left|
|-align=center
|Win
|30–4
|align=left| Joe Stofle
|TKO
|1 
|2008-08-06
|align=left| BB King Blues Club & Grill, New York City, New York, U.S.
|align=left|
|-align=center
|Win
|29–4
|align=left| Jeff Yeoman
|TKO
|2 
|2008-03-06
|align=left| Grand Ballroom, New York City, New York, U.S.
|align=left|
|-align=center
|Win
|28–4
|align=left| Jason Barnett
|DQ
|7 
|2007-10-18
|align=left| Hammerstein Ballroom, New York City, New York, U.S.
|align=left|
|-align=center
|Loss
|27–4
|align=left| Evander Holyfield
|TKO
|3 
|2007-03-17
|align=left| American Bank Center, Corpus Christi, Texas, U.S.
|align=left|
|-align=center
|style="background:#ddd;"|NC
|27–3
|align=left| Julius Long
|ND
|5 
|2006-12-15
|align=left| Merchant Marine Academy, Kings Point, New York, U.S.
|align=left|
|-align=center
|Win
|27–3
|align=left| Jermell Barnes
|MD
|10
|2006-08-18	
|align=left| Conference Center, Saratoga Springs, New York, U.S.
|align=left|
|-align=center
|Win
|26–3
|align=left| Dan Whetzel
|KO
|2 
|2006-06-09
|align=left| Tropicana Hotel & Casino, Atlantic City, New Jersey, U.S.
|align=left|
|-align=center
|Loss
|25–3
|align=left| Brian Minto
|TKO
|7 
|2005-10-01
|align=left| St. Pete Times Forum, Tampa, Florida, U.S.
|align=left|
|-align=center
|Win
|25–2
|align=left| Shannon Miller
|TKO
|5 
|2005-08-19	
|align=left| City Center, Saratoga Springs, New York, U.S.
|align=left|
|-align=center
|Win
|24–2
|align=left| Dennis McKinney
|TKO
|4 
|2005-06-18
|align=left| FedExForum, Memphis, Tennessee, U.S.
|align=left|
|-align=center
|Win
|23–2
|align=left| Troy Weida
|TKO
|5 
|2005-04-09	
|align=left| Turning Stone Resort, Verona, New York, U.S.
|align=left|
|-align=center
|Win
|22–2
|align=left| Ronnie Smith
|UD
|6
|2004-12-18
|align=left| Staples Center, Los Angeles, California, U.S.
|align=left|
|-align=center
|Loss
|21–2
|align=left| Brian Minto
|KO
|10 
|2004-07-23
|align=left| Trump Taj Mahal, Atlantic City, New Jersey, U.S.
|align=left|
|-align=center
|Win
|21–1
|align=left| Joe Lenhart
|TKO
|5 
|2004-06-12
|align=left| Cedarbridge Academy, Devonshire, Bermuda
|align=left|
|-align=center
|Win
|20–1
|align=left| Marvin Hunt
|KO
|1 
|2003-10-22	
|align=left| Crowne Plaza Hotel, New York City, New York, U.S.
|align=left|
|-align=center
|Win
|19–1
|align=left| Dennis McKinney
|SD
|4
|2003-04-04
|align=left| Mohegan Sun Casino, Uncasville, Connecticut, U.S.
|align=left|
|-align=center
|Win
|18–1
|align=left| Bryan Blakely
|TKO
|2 
|2003-03-14	
|align=left| Resorts Hotel & Casino, Atlantic City, New Jersey, U.S.
|align=left|
|-align=center
|Win
|17–1
|align=left| Giles Knox
|KO
|2 
|2003-01-16
|align=left| House of Blues, Myrtle Beach, South Carolina, U.S.
|align=left|
|-align=center
|Win
|16–1
|align=left| Edward Slater
|TKO
|2 
|2002-09-28
|align=left| Westin Resort, Innisbrook, Florida, U.S.
|align=left|
|-align=center
|Loss
|15–1
|align=left| Alfred Cole
|UD
|6
|2002-06-29
|align=left| Taj Majal Hotel & Casino, Atlantic City, New Jersey, U.S.
|align=left|
|-align=center
|Win
|15–0
|align=left| Clarence Goins
|TKO
|2 
|2002-03-02	
|align=left| Crown Reef Resort, Myrtle Beach, South Carolina, U.S.
|align=left|
|-align=center
|Win
|14–0
|align=left| Joey Guy
|TKO
|2 
|2002-02-06	
|align=left| Yonkers Raceway, Yonkers, New York, U.S.
|align=left|
|-align=center
|Win
|13–0
|align=left| Craig Tomlinson
|TKO
|4 
|2001-10-03		
|align=left| Yonkers Raceway, Yonkers, New York, U.S.
|align=left|
|-align=center
|Win
|12–0
|align=left| Errol Sadikovski
|UD
|8 
|2001-05-17		
|align=left| Roseland Ballroom, New York City, New York, U.S.
|align=left|
|-align=center
|Win
|11–0
|align=left| Alejandro Torres
|UD
|6 
|2001-03-14			
|align=left| Yonkers Raceway, Yonkers, New York, U.S.
|align=left|
|-align=center
|Win
|10–0
|align=left| Mike Middleton
|TKO
|4 
|2000-10-11				
|align=left| Yonkers Raceway, Yonkers, New York, U.S.
|align=left|
|-align=center
|Win
|9–0
|align=left| Jason Gethers
|TKO
|2 
|2000-06-16			
|align=left| IBEW Hall, Hauppauge, New York, U.S.
|align=left|
|-align=center
|Win
|8–0
|align=left| Kevin Rosier
|PTS
|6
|2000-03-14			
|align=left| Yonkers Raceway, Yonkers, New York, U.S.
|align=left|
|-align=center
|Win
|7–0
|align=left| Louis Gallucci
|TKO
|2 
|1999-12-07				
|align=left| Yonkers Raceway, Yonkers, New York, U.S.
|align=left|
|-align=center
|Win
|6–0
|align=left| Louis Gallucci
|UD
|4
|1999-11-09					
|align=left| Yonkers Raceway, Yonkers, New York, U.S.
|align=left|
|-align=center
|Win
|5–0
|align=left| Greg Jones
|TKO
|2 
|1999-07-20					
|align=left| Yonkers Raceway, Yonkers, New York, U.S.
|align=left|
|-align=center
|Win
|4–0
|align=left| Tom Williams
|PTS
|4
|1999-06-24						
|align=left| Atlanta, Georgia, U.S.
|align=left|
|-align=center
|Win
|3–0
|align=left| Randy Martin
|TKO
|1 
|1999-06-18
|align=left| SE Livestock Pavilion Ocala, Florida, U.S.
|align=left|
|-align=center
|Win
|2–0
|align=left|Markowitz March
|TKO
|1 
|1999-05-15
|align=left| Augusta, Georgia, U.S.
|align=left|
|-align=center
|Win
|1–0
|align=left| Kinard Thomas
|TKO
|1 
|1999-04-23	
|align=left| Coliseum, Greensboro, North Carolina, U.S.
|align=left|

References

External links 
 

1973 births
Living people
American people of Italian descent
Boxers from New York (state)
People from Flushing, Queens
American male boxers
Heavyweight boxers